The canton of Saint-André-les-Vergers is an administrative division of the Aube department, northeastern France. It was created at the French canton reorganisation which came into effect in March 2015. Its seat is in Saint-André-les-Vergers.

It consists of the following communes:
La Rivière-de-Corps
Rosières-près-Troyes
Saint-André-les-Vergers
Saint-Germain
Torvilliers

References

Cantons of Aube